A hairstyle, hairdo, haircut or coiffure refers to the styling of hair, usually on the human head but sometimes on the face or body. The fashioning of hair can be considered an aspect of personal grooming, fashion, and cosmetics, although practical, cultural, and popular considerations also influence some hairstyles.

The oldest known depiction of hair styling is hair braiding which dates back about 30,000 years. Women's hair was often elaborately and carefully dressed in special ways, though it was also often kept covered outside the home, especially for married women.

Prehistory and history
People's hair styles are largely determined by the fashions of the culture they live in. Hairstyles are markers and signifiers of social class, age, marital status, racial identification, political beliefs, and attitudes about gender.

Some people may cover their hair totally or partially for cultural or religious reasons. Notable examples of head covering include women in Islam who wear the hijab, married women in Haredi Judaism who wear the sheitel or tichel, married Himba men who cover their hair except when in mourning, Tuareg men who wear a veil, and baptized men and women in Sikhism who wear the dastar.

Paleolithic
The oldest known reproduction of hair braiding lies back about 30,000 years: the Venus of Willendorf, now known in academia as the Woman of Willendorf, of a female figurine from the Paleolithic, estimated to have been made between about 28,000 and 25,000 BCE.
The Venus of Brassempouy counts about 25,000 years old and indisputably shows hairstyling.

Bronze Age

In the Bronze Age, razors were known and in use by some men, but not on a daily basis since the procedure was rather unpleasant and required resharpening of the tool which reduced its endurance.

Ancient history
In ancient civilizations, women's hair was often elaborately and carefully dressed in special ways. Women coloured their hair, curled it, and pinned it up (ponytail) in a variety of ways. They set their hair in waves and curls using wet clay, which they dried in the sun and then combed out, or else by using a jelly made of quince seeds soaked in water, or curling tongs and curling irons of various kinds.

Roman Empire and Middle Ages

Between 27 BC and 102 AD, in Imperial Rome, women wore their hair in complicated styles: a mass of curls on top, or in rows of waves, drawn back into ringlets or braids. Eventually noblewomen's hairstyles grew so complex that they required daily attention from several slaves and a stylist in order to be maintained. The hair was often lightened using wood ash, unslaked lime and sodium bicarbonate, or darkened with copper filings, oak-apples or leeches marinated in wine and vinegar.  It was augmented by wigs, hairpieces and pads, and held in place by nets, pins, combs and pomade. Under the Byzantine Empire, noblewomen covered most of their hair with silk caps and pearl nets.

From the time of the Roman Empire until the Middle Ages, most women grew their hair as long as it would naturally grow. It was normally just styled through cutting, as women's hair was tied up on the head and covered on most occasions when outside the home by using a snood, kerchief or veil; for an adult woman to wear uncovered and loose hair in the street was often restricted to prostitutes. Braiding and tying the hair was common. In the 16th century, women began to wear their hair in extremely ornate styles, often decorated with pearls, precious stones, ribbons, and veils. Women used a technique called "lacing" or "taping," in which cords or ribbons were used to bind the hair around their heads. During this period, most of the hair was braided and hidden under wimples, veils or couvrechefs. In the later half of the 15th century and on into the 16th century, a very high hairline on the forehead was considered attractive, and wealthy women frequently plucked out hair at their temples and the napes of their necks, or used depilatory cream to remove it, if it would otherwise be visible at the edges of their hair coverings. Working-class women in this period wore their hair in simple styles.

Early modern history

Male styles
During the 15th and 16th centuries, European men wore their hair cropped no longer than shoulder-length, with very fashionable men wearing bangs or fringes. In Italy, it was common for men to dye their hair. In the early 17th century male hairstyles grew longer, with waves or curls being considered desirable in upper-class European men.

The male wig was supposedly pioneered by King Louis XIII of France (1601–1643) in 1624 when he had prematurely begun to bald. This fashion was largely promoted by his son and successor Louis XIV of France (1638–1715) that contributed to its spread in European and European-influenced countries. The beard had been in a long decline and now disappeared among the upper classes.

Perukes or periwigs for men were introduced into the English-speaking world with other French styles when Charles II was restored to the throne in 1660, following a lengthy exile in France. These wigs were shoulder-length or longer, imitating the long hair that had become fashionable among men since the 1620s. Their use soon became popular in the English court. The London diarist Samuel Pepys recorded the day in 1665 that a barber had shaved his head and that he tried on his new periwig for the first time, but in a year of plague he was uneasy about wearing it:3rd September 1665: Up, and put on my coloured silk suit, very fine, and my new periwig, bought a good while since, but darst not wear it because the plague was in Westminster when I bought it. And it is a wonder what will be the fashion after the plague is done as to periwigs, for nobody will dare to buy any hair for fear of the infection? That it had been cut off the heads of people dead of the plague.

Late 17th-century wigs were very long and wavy (see George I below), but became shorter in the mid-18th century, by which time they were normally white (George II). A very common style had a single stiff curl running round the head at the end of the hair. By the late 18th century the natural hair was often powdered to achieve the impression of a short wig, tied into a small tail or "queue" behind (George III).

Short hair for fashionable men was a product of the Neoclassical movement. Classically inspired male hair styles included the Bedford Crop, arguably the precursor of most plain modern male styles, which was invented by the radical politician Francis Russell, 5th Duke of Bedford as a protest against a tax on hair powder; he encouraged his friends to adopt it by betting them they would not. Another influential style (or group of styles) was named by the French "à la Titus" after Titus Junius Brutus (not in fact the Roman Emperor Titus as often assumed), with hair short and layered but somewhat piled up on the crown, often with restrained quiffs or locks hanging down; variants are familiar from the hair of both Napoleon and George IV. The style was supposed to have been introduced by the actor François-Joseph Talma, who upstaged his wigged co-actors when appearing in productions of works such as Voltaire's Brutus (about Lucius Junius Brutus, who orders the execution of his son Titus).  In 1799, a Parisian fashion magazine reported that even bald men were adopting Titus wigs, and the style was also worn by women, the Journal de Paris reporting in 1802 that "more than half of elegant women were wearing their hair or wig à la Titus."

In the early 19th century the male beard, and also moustaches and sideburns, made a strong reappearance, associated with the Romantic movement, and all remained very common until the 1890s, after which younger men ceased to wear them, with World War I, when the majority of men in many countries saw military service, finally despatching the full beard except for older men retaining the styles of their youth, and those affecting a Bohemian look. The short military-style moustache remained popular.

Female styles

From the 16th to the 19th century, European women's hair became more visible while their hair coverings grew smaller, with both becoming more elaborate, and with hairstyles beginning to include ornamentation such as flowers, ostrich plumes, ropes of pearls, jewels, ribbons and small crafted objects such as replicas of ships and windmills. Bound hair was felt to be symbolic of propriety: loosening one's hair was considered immodest and sexual, and sometimes was felt to have supernatural connotations. Red hair was popular, particularly in England during the reign of the red-haired Elizabeth I, and women and aristocratic men used borax, saltpeter, saffron and sulfur powder to dye their hair red, making themselves nauseated and giving themselves headaches and nosebleeds. During this period in Spain and Latin cultures, women wore lace mantillas, often worn over a high comb,  and in Buenos Aires, there developed a fashion for extremely large tortoise-shell hair combs called peinetón, which could measure up to three feet in height and width, and which are said by historians to have reflected the growing influence of France, rather than Spain, upon Argentinians.

In the middle of the 18th century the pouf style developed, with women creating volume in the hair at the front of the head, usually with a pad underneath to lift it higher, and ornamented the back with seashells, pearls or gemstones. In 1750, women began dressing their hair with perfumed pomade and powdering it white. Just before World War I, some women began wearing silk turbans over their hair.

Japan
During this period, Japanese women were still wearing traditional hairstyles held up with combs, pins, and sticks crafted from tortoise, metal, wood and other materials, but in the middle 1880s, upper-class Japanese women began pushing back their hair in the Western style (known as ), or adopting Westernized versions of traditional Japanese hairstyles (these were called , or literally, "soirée chignon").

Inter-war years
During the First World War, women around the world started to shift to shorter hairstyles that were easier to manage. In the 1920s women started for the first time to bob, shingle and crop their hair, often covering it with small head-hugging cloche hats. In Korea, the bob was called . Women began marcelling their hair, creating deep waves in it using heated scissor irons. Durable permanent waving became popular also in this period:  it was an expensive, uncomfortable and time-consuming process, in which the hair was put in curlers and inserted into a steam or dry heat machine. During the 1930s women began to wear their hair slightly longer, in pageboys, bobs or waves and curls.

During this period, Western men began to wear their hair in ways popularized by movie stars such as Douglas Fairbanks, Jr. and Rudolph Valentino. Men wore their hair short, and either parted on the side or in the middle, or combed straight back, and used pomade, creams and tonics to keep their hair in place. At the beginning of the Second World War and for some time afterwards, men's haircuts grew shorter, mimicking the military crewcut.

During the 1920s and 1930s, Japanese women began wearing their hair in a style called  (literally, "ear hiding"), in which hair was pulled back to cover the ears and tied into a bun at the nape of the neck. Waved or curled hair became increasingly popular for Japanese women throughout this period, and permanent waves, though controversial, were extremely popular.

Post-war years

After the war, women started to wear their hair in softer, more natural styles. In the early 1950s women's hair was generally curled and worn in a variety of styles and lengths. In the later 1950s, high bouffant and beehive styles, sometimes nicknamed B-52s for their similarity to the bulbous noses of the B-52 Stratofortress bomber, became popular.  During this period many women washed and set their hair only once a week, and kept it in place by wearing curlers every night and reteasing and respraying it every morning.  In the 1960s, many women began to wear their hair in short modern cuts such as the pixie cut, while in the 1970s, hair tended to be longer and looser. In both the 1960s and 1970s many men and women wore their hair very long and straight. Women straightened their hair through chemical straightening processes, by ironing their hair at home with a clothes iron, or by rolling it up with large empty cans while wet. African-American men and women began wearing their hair naturally (unprocessed) in large Afros, sometimes ornamented with Afro picks made from wood or plastic. By the end of the 1970s the Afro had fallen out of favour among African-Americans, and was being replaced by other natural hairstyles such as corn rows and dreadlocks.

Contemporary hairstyles

Since the 1960s and 70s, women have worn their hair in a wide variety of fairly natural styles. In the 1980s, women pulled back their hair with scrunchies, stretchy ponytail holders made from cloth over fabric bands. Women also often wear glittery ornaments today, as well as claw-style barrettes used to secure ponytails and other upswept or partially upswept hairstyles. Today, women and men can choose from a broad range of hairstyles, but they are still expected to wear their hair in ways that conform to gender norms: in much of the world, men with long hair and women whose hair does not appear carefully groomed may face various forms of discrimination, including harassment, social shaming or workplace discrimination. This is somewhat less true of African-American men, who wear their hair in a variety of styles that overlap with those of African-American women, including box braids and cornrows fastened with rubber bands and dreadlocks.

Defining factors

A hairstyle's aesthetic considerations may be determined by many factors, such as the subject's physical attributes and desired self-image and/or the stylist's artistic instincts.

Physical factors include natural hair type and growth patterns, face and head shape from various angles, and overall body proportions; medical considerations may also apply. Self-image may be directed toward conforming to mainstream values (military-style crew cuts or current "fad" hairstyles such as the Dido flip), identifying with distinctively groomed subgroups (e.g., punk hair), or obeying religious dictates (e.g., Orthodox Jewish have payot, Rastafari have Dreadlocks, North India jatas, or the Sikh practice of Kesh), though this is highly contextual such that "mainstream" look in one setting may be limited to a "subgroup" in another.

A hairstyle is achieved by arranging hair in a certain way, occasionally using combs, a blow-dryer, gel, or other products. The practice of styling hair is often called hairdressing, especially when done as an occupation.

Hairstyling may also include adding accessories (such as headbands or barrettes) to the hair to hold it in place, enhance its ornamental appearance, or partially or fully conceal it with coverings such as a kippa, hijab, tam or turban.

Process

Hair dressing may include cuts, weaves, coloring, extensions, perms, permanent relaxers, curling, and any other form of styling or texturing.

Washing
Stylists often wash a subject's hair first, so that the hair is cut while still slightly damp. Compared to dry hair, wet hair can be easier to manage in a cut/style situation because the added weight and surface tension of the water cause the strands to stretch downward and cling together along the hair's length, holding a line and making it easier for the stylist to create a form. It is important to note that this method of cutting hair while wet, may be most suitable (or common) for straight hair types. Curly, kinky and other types of hair textures with considerable volume may benefit from cutting while dry, as the hair is in a more natural state and the hair can be cut evenly.

Cutting
Hair cutting or hair trimming is intended to create or maintain a specific shape and form. There are ways to trim one's own hair but usually another person is enlisted to perform the process, as it is difficult to maintain symmetry while cutting hair at the back of one's head.

Cutting hair is often done with hair clipper, scissors, and razors. Combs and hair grips are often employed to isolate a section of hair which is then trimmed.

Brushing and combing
Brushes and combs are used to organize and untangle the hair, encouraging all of the strands to lie in the same direction and removing debris such as lint, dandruff, or hairs that have already shed from their follicles but continue to cling to the other hairs.

There are all manner of detangling tools available in a wide variety of price ranges.  Combs come in all shapes and sizes and all manner of materials including plastics, wood, and horn.  Similarly, brushes also come in all sizes and shapes, including various paddle shapes.  Most benefit from using some form of a wide tooth comb for detangling.  Most physicians advise against sharing hair care instruments like combs and clips, to prevent spreading hair conditions like dandruff and head lice.

The historical dictum to brush hair with one hundred strokes every day is somewhat archaic, dating from a time when hair was washed less frequently; the brushstrokes would spread the scalp's natural oils down through the hair, creating a protective effect. Now, however, this does not apply when the natural oils have been washed off by frequent shampoos. Also, hairbrushes are now usually made with rigid plastic bristles instead of the natural boar's bristles that were once standard; the plastic bristles increase the likelihood of actually injuring the scalp and hair with excessively vigorous brushing. However, traditional brushes with boar's bristles are still commonly used among African Americans and those with coarse or kinky textures to soften and lay down curls and waves.

Drying
Hair dryers speed the drying process of hair by blowing air, which is usually heated, over the wet hair shaft to accelerate the rate of water evaporation.

Excessive heat may increase the rate of shaft-splitting or other damage to the hair.  Hair dryer diffusers can be used to widen the stream of air flow so it is weaker but covers a larger area of the hair.

Hair dryers can also be used as a tool to sculpt the hair to a very slight degree. Proper technique involves aiming the dryer such that the air does not blow onto the face or scalp, which can cause burns.

Other common hair drying techniques include towel drying and air drying.

Braiding and updos
Tight or frequent braiding may pull at the hair roots and cause traction alopecia. Rubber bands with metal clasps or tight clips, which bend the hair shaft at extreme angles, can have the same effect.

An updo is a hair style that involves arranging the hair so that it is pointing up. It can be as simple as a ponytail, but is more commonly associated with more elaborate styles intended for special occasions such as a prom or weddings.

If hair is pinned too tightly, or the whole updo slips causing pulling on the hair in the follicle at the hair root, it can cause aggravation to the hair follicle and result in headaches. Although some people of African heritage may use braiding extensions (long term braiding hairstyle) as a form of convenience and/or as a reflection of personal style, it is important not to keep the braids up longer than needed to avoid hair breakage or hair loss. Proper braiding technique and maintenance can result in no hair damage even with repeated braid styles.

Curling and straightening
Curling and straightening hair requires the stylist to use a curling rod or a flat iron to get a desired look. These irons use heat to manipulate the hair into a variety of waves, curls and reversing natural curls and temporarily straightening the hair. Straightening or even curling hair can damage it due to direct heat from the iron and applying chemicals afterwards to keep its shape.
There are irons that have a function to straighten or curl hair even when it's damp (from showering or wetting the hair), but this requires more heat than the average iron (temperatures can range from 300 to 450 degrees). Heat protection sprays and hair-repairing shampoos and conditioners can protect hair from damage caused by the direct heat from the irons.

Industry

Hair styling is a major world industry, from the salon itself to products, advertising, and even magazines on the subject. In the United States, most hairstylists are licensed after obtaining training at a cosmetology or beauty school.

In recent years, competitive events for professional stylists have grown in popularity. Stylists compete on deadline to create the most elaborate hairstyle using props, lights and other accessories.

Tools

Styling tools may include hair irons (including flat, curling, and crimping irons), hair dryers, hair brushes and hair rollers. Hair dressing might also include the use of hair product to add texture, shine, curl, volume or hold to a particular style.  Hairpins are also used when creating particular hairstyles.  Their uses and designs vary over different cultural backgrounds.

Products
Styling products aside from shampoo and conditioner are many and varied. Leave-in conditioner, conditioning treatments, mousse, gels, lotions, waxes, creams, clays, serums, oils, and sprays are used to change the texture or shape of the hair, or to hold it in place in a certain style.  Applied properly, most styling products will not damage the hair apart from drying it out; most styling products contain alcohols, which can dissolve oils.  Many hair products contain chemicals which can cause build-up, resulting in dull hair or a change in perceived texture.

Wigs

Care of human or other natural hair wigs is similar to care of a normal head of hair in that the wig can be brushed, styled, and kept clean using haircare products. Wigs can serve as a form of protective styling that allows freedom of control of the hairstyling. 

Synthetic wigs are usually made from a fine fiber that mimics human hair. This fiber can be made in almost any color and hairstyle, and is often glossier than human hair. However, this fiber is sensitive to heat and cannot be styled with flat irons or curling irons. There is a newer synthetic fiber that can take heat up to a certain temperature.

Human hair wigs can be styled with heat, and they must be brushed only when dry. Synthetic and human hair wigs should be brushed dry before shampooing to remove tangles. To clean the wig, the wig should be dipped into a container with water and mild shampoo, then dipped in clear water and moved up and down to remove excess water. The wig must then be air dried naturally into its own hairstyle. Proper maintenance can make a human hair wig last for many years.

Functional and decorative ornaments
There are many options to embellish and arrange the hair.  Hairpins, clasps, barrettes, headbands, ribbons, rubber bands, scrunchies, and combs can be used to achieve a variety of styles.  There are also many decorative ornaments that, while they may have clasps to affix them to the hair, are used solely for appearance and do not aid in keeping the hair in place. In India for example, the Gajra (flower garland) is common there are heaps on hair.

Social and cultural implications

Gender
At most times in most cultures, men have worn their hair in styles that are different from women's. American sociologist Rose Weitz once wrote that the most widespread cultural rule about hair is that women's hair must differ from men's hair. An exception is the men and women living in the Orinoco-Amazon Basin, where traditionally both genders have worn their hair cut into a bowl shape. In Western countries in the 1960s, both young men and young women wore their hair long and natural, and since then it has become more common for men to grow their hair. During most periods in human history when men and women wore similar hairstyles, as in the 1920s and 1960s, it has generated significant social concern and approbation.

Religion
Hair in religion also plays an important role since women and men, when deciding to dedicate their life to faith, often change their haircut. Catholic nuns often cut their hair very short, and men who joined Catholic monastic orders in the eighth century adopted what was known as the tonsure, which involved shaving the tops of their heads and leaving a ring of hair around the bald crown. Many Buddhists, Hajj pilgrims and Vaisnavas, especially members of the Hare Krishna movement who are brahmacharis or sannyasis, shave their heads. Some Hindu and most Buddhist monks and nuns shave their heads upon entering their order, and Korean Buddhist monks and nuns have their heads shaved every 15 days. Adherents of Sikhism are required to wear their hair unshorn. Women usually wear it in a braid or a bun and men cover it with a turban.

Marital status
In the 1800s, American women started wearing their hair up when they became ready to get married. Among the Fulani people of west Africa, unmarried women wear their hair ornamented with small amber beads and coins, while married women wear large amber ornaments. Marriage is signified among the Toposa women of South Sudan by wearing the hair in many small pigtails. Unmarried Hopi women have traditionally worn a "butterfly" hairstyle characterized by a twist or whorl of hair at each side of the face. Hindu widows in India used to shave their heads as part of their mourning although that practice has mostly disappeared.

Life transitions
In many cultures, including Hindu culture and among the Wayana people of the Guiana highlands, young people have historically shaved off their hair to denote coming-of-age. Women in India historically have signified adulthood by switching from wearing two braids to one. Among the Rendille of north-eastern Kenya and the Tchikrin people of the Brazilian rainforest, both men and women shave their heads after the death of a close family member. When a man died in ancient Greece, his wife cut off her hair and buried it with him, and in Hindu families, the chief mourner is expected to shave his or her head 3 days after the death.

Social class
Upper-class people have always used their hairstyles to signal wealth and status. Wealthy Roman women wore complex hairstyles that needed the labours of several people to maintain them, and rich people have also often chosen hairstyles that restricted or burdened their movement, making it obvious that they did not need to work. Wealthy people's hairstyles used to be at the cutting edge of fashion, setting the styles for the less wealthy. But today, the wealthy are generally observed to wear their hair in conservative styles that date back decades prior.

Middle-class hairstyles tend to be understated and professional. Middle-class people aspire to have their hair look healthy and natural, implying that they have the resources to live a healthy lifestyle and take good care of themselves.

Working-class people's haircuts have tended to be practical and simple. Working-class men have often shaved their heads or worn their hair close-cropped, and working-class women have typically pulled their hair up and off their faces in simple styles. However, today, working-class people often have more elaborate and fashion-conscious hairstyles than other social classes. Many working-class Mexican men in American cities wear their hair in styles like the Mongolian (shaved except for a tuft of hair at the nape of the neck) or the rat tail (crewcut on top, tuft at the nape), and African-Americans often wear their hair in complex patterns of box braids and cornrows, fastened with barrettes and beads, and sometimes including shaved sections or bright colour. Sociologists say these styles are an attempt to express individuality and presence in the face of social denigration and invisibility.

Haircuts in space

Haircuts also occur in the International Space Station. During the various expeditions astronauts use hair clippers attached to vacuum devices for grooming their colleagues so that the cut hair will not drift inside the weightless environment of the space station and become a nuisance to the astronauts or a hazard to the sensitive equipment installations inside the station.

Haircutting in space was also used for charitable purposes in the case of astronaut Sunita Williams who obtained such a haircut by fellow astronaut Joan Higginbotham inside  the International Space Station. Sunita's ponytail was brought back to earth with the STS-116 crew and was donated to Locks of Love.

See also
 Asymmetric cut
 Eponymous hairstyle
 Historical Christian hairstyles
 List of hairstyles
 Regular haircut
 Roman hairstyles
 Osadia
 Hair loss

References

External links

 
Style